11β-Hydroxyprogesterone (11β-OHP), also known as 21-deoxycorticosterone, as well as 11β-hydroxypregn-4-ene-3,20-dione, is a naturally occurring, endogenous steroid and derivative of progesterone. It is a potent mineralocorticoid. Syntheses of 11β-OHP from progesterone is catalyzed by the steroid 11β-hydroxylase (CYP11B1) enzyme, and, to a lesser extent, by the aldosterone synthase enzyme (CYP11B2).

Function 
Along with its epimer 11α-hydroxyprogesterone (11α-OHP), 11β-OHP has been identified as a very potent competitive inhibitor of both isoforms (1 and 2) of 11β-hydroxysteroid dehydrogenase (11β-HSD).

Outcome of 21-hydroxylase deficiency
It has been known since 1987 that increased levels of 11β-OHP occur in 21-hydroxylase deficiency. A study in 2017 has shown that in subjects with 21-hydroxylase deficiency, serum 11β-OHP concentrations range from 0.012 to 3.37 ng/mL, while in control group it was below detection limit of 0.012 ng/mL. 21-hydroxylase is an enzyme that is also involved in progesterone metabolism, producing 11-deoxycorticosterone. In normal conditions, 21-hydroxylase has higher activity on progesterone than steroid 11β-hydroxylase (CYP11B1) and aldosterone synthase (CYP11B2) that convert progesterone to 11β-OHP. That's why in 21-hydroxylase deficiency, given the normal function of the CYP11B enzymes, the progesterone is directed towards 11β-OHP pathway rather than towards 11-deoxycorticosterone pathway, that is also usually accompanied by an increase in progesterone levels. In the normal route to aldosterone and cortisol, progesterone and 17α-hydroxyprogesterone are first hydroxylated at position 21 and then hydroxylated at other positions. In 21-hydroxylase deficiency, progesterone and 17α-hydroxyprogesterone accumulate and are the substrates of steroid 11β-hydroxylase, leading to 1β-OHP and 21-deoxycortisol, respectively. In the 2017 study above mentioned, serum progesterone concentrations in boys (10 days to 18 years old) with 21-hydroxylase deficiency reached levels similar to female luteal values (up to 10.14 ng/mL, depending on severity and treatment), while in the control group of boys progesterone was 0.07 ng/mL (0.22 nmol/L) on average, ranged from 0.05 to 0.40 ng/mL.

While studies suggest that 11β-OHP, also known as 21-deoxycorticosterone, can be used as marker for adrenal 21-hydroxylase deficiency, another 21-carbon steroid — 21-deoxycortisol (produced from 17α-hydroxyprogesterone) gained acceptance for this purpose.

See also 
 21-Deoxycortisol (11β,17α-dihydroxyprogesterone)
 11-Deoxycorticosterone (21-hydroxyprogesterone)
 Corticosterone (11β,21-dihydroxyprogesterone)
 Cortisol (11β,17α,21-trihydroxyprogesterone)
 11-Deoxycortisol (17α,21-dihydroxyprogesterone)
 9α-Bromo-11-ketoprogesterone

References

External links 
 Metabocard for 11β-Hydroxyprogesterone (HMDB04031) - Human Metabolome Database

11β-Hydroxysteroid dehydrogenase inhibitors
Cyclohexanols
Diketones
Human metabolites
Mineralocorticoids
Pregnanes
Enones